John Fernandez Raspado (born February 20, 1981, in Quezon City) is a Filipino businessman and pageant titleholder who was crowned Mr. Gay World 2017. He won Mr. Gay World Philippines 2016, therefore earning the right to represent the country in Mr. Gay World. He was the first Filipino and Southeast Asian man to win the title as Mr. Gay World.

Before his pageant stint, he was the grand champion of ABS-CBN's It's Showtime: I Am Pogay contest. His personal life story was also featured in a Lenten television special of the same network.

References 

1984 births
Filipino make-up artists
Filipino LGBT businesspeople
Filipino gay artists
Gay businessmen
Living people
Filipino beauty pageant winners
Mister Gay World winners
People from Mandaluyong
People from Batangas